Bert Papenfuß (born 11 January 1956 in Stavenhagen; also Bert Papenfuß-Gorek) is a German poet.

Life
Papenfuß is a learned electrician and sound and lighting technician. After serving time in the East German army as a Bausoldat (construction soldier) he worked at the theatre, first in Schwerin and from 1976 in Berlin. He belonged to the literature scene of Prenzlauer Berg, which developed in the late 1970s and has been a freelance writer since 1980. He collaborated with numerous artists and musicians, such as A. R. Penck and Tarwater.

From 1999 to 2009 he was co-owner of the Kaffee Burger club (famous for Wladimir Kaminers Russendisko), where he coordinated the cultural programme Salon Brückenkopf. He is co-editor of the anarchistic magazine Gegner and the cultural magazine Zonic. He is co-owner of the culture café Rumbalotte Contiua, which opened doors on 17 September 2010.

Awards
1988 N.-C.-Caser-Prize
1991 F.-C.-Weiskopf-Prize
1996 :de:Stadtschreiber zu Rheinsberg ("City Writer", or Guest Writer, of Rheinsberg, Germany)
1998 Erich Fried Prize
2008 Eugen Viehof-Ehrengabe of the German Schiller Foundation

Selected works
 harm. arkdichtung 77, KULTuhr Verlag, Berlin 1985.
 dreizehntanz, Aufbau-Verlag, Berlin und Weimar 1988.
 SoJa, (with drawings by Wolfram Adalbert Scheffler), Druckhaus Galrev, Berlin 1990.
 tiské (with drawings by A. R. Penck), Steidl Verlag, Göttingen 1990.
 vorwärts im zorn &sw. (with 7 graphics by Strawalde), Aufbau Verlag, Berlin 1990.
 led saudaus. notdichtung, karrendichtung (with drawings by the author), Janus press, Berlin 1991.
 routine in die romantik des alltags (with drawings by Helge Leiberg), Janus Press, Berlin 1995.
 Berliner Zapfenstreich: Schnelle Eingreifgesänge (with drawings by A.R. Penck), BasisDruck Verlag, Berlin 1996.
 SBZ - Land und Leute (with drawings by Silka Teichert), Druckhaus Galrev, Berlin 1998.
 Tanzwirtschaft. Ein angewandter Fortsetzungsroman, www.kaffeeburger.de, Berlin 2001
 Haarbogensturz. Versuche über Staat und Welt (with drawings by Tom Platt), BasisDruck Verlag, Berlin 2001.
 Rumbalotte. Gedichte 1998-2002, Urs Engeler Editor, Basel, Weil am Rhein und Wien 2005.
 Ation-Aganda: Gedichte 1983/1990 (with drawings by Ronald Lippok), Urs Engeler Editor, Basel, Weil am Rhein und Wien 2008.

References

External links
 Bert Papenfuß at Galrev Verlag
 Bert Papenfuß at Verlag Urs Engeler Editor

Living people
1956 births
German poets